Admin may refer to:

 An abbreviated form of the word administrator, particularly in computing contexts
 Admin, son of Arni, a minor biblical figure

See also